The 2013 Belgian Figure Skating Championships took place between 23 and 24 November 2012 in Deurne. Skaters competed in the discipline of ladies' singles on the senior level and men's and ladies' singles across the junior, advanced novice, as well as the age-group levels of minime/miniem A, B, and C.

Results

Ladies
Kim Bell from the Netherlands was a guest competitor.

External links
 SkateBelgium
 Results

2013
2013 in figure skating
2012 in figure skating